Patellapis is a genus of bees belonging to the family Halictidae.

The species of this genus are found in Europe, Northern America, Africa, Australia.

Species:

Patellapis aberdarica 
Patellapis abessinica 
Patellapis abnormis 
Patellapis africana 
Patellapis albipilata 
Patellapis albofasciata 
Patellapis albofilosa 
Patellapis albolineola 
Patellapis alopex 
Patellapis andersoni 
Patellapis andreniformis 
Patellapis andrenoides 
Patellapis assamica 
Patellapis atricilla 
Patellapis ausica 
Patellapis azurea 
Patellapis baralonga 
Patellapis bedana 
Patellapis benoiti 
Patellapis bidentata 
Patellapis bifurcata 
Patellapis bihamata 
Patellapis bilineata 
Patellapis binghami 
Patellapis braunsella 
Patellapis braunsi 
Patellapis burmana 
Patellapis buruana 
Patellapis burungana 
Patellapis burungensis 
Patellapis calvini 
Patellapis calviniensis 
Patellapis cameroni 
Patellapis capillipalpis 
Patellapis carinostriata 
Patellapis castanea 
Patellapis celebensis 
Patellapis cerealis 
Patellapis chaetalictus
Patellapis chubbi 
Patellapis cincticauda 
Patellapis cinctifera 
Patellapis cinctulella 
Patellapis coccinea 
Patellapis cockerelli 
Patellapis communis 
Patellapis concinnula 
Patellapis corallina 
Patellapis dapanensis 
Patellapis delphinensis 
Patellapis depressa 
Patellapis disposita 
Patellapis dispositina 
Patellapis doleritica 
Patellapis drakensbergensis 
Patellapis eardleyi 
Patellapis erythropyga 
Patellapis fisheri 
Patellapis flacourtiae 
Patellapis flavofasciata 
Patellapis flavorufa 
Patellapis flavovittata 
Patellapis formosicola 
Patellapis friesei 
Patellapis fuliginosa 
Patellapis fynbosensis 
Patellapis gabonensis 
Patellapis gessorum 
Patellapis glabra 
Patellapis gowdeyi 
Patellapis gruenebergensis 
Patellapis hakkiesdraadi 
Patellapis hargreavesi 
Patellapis harunganae 
Patellapis heterozonia 
Patellapis heterozonica 
Patellapis hirsuta 
Patellapis impunctata 
Patellapis inelegans 
Patellapis interstitialis 
Patellapis intricata 
Patellapis itigiensis 
Patellapis ivoirensis 
Patellapis javana 
Patellapis joffrei 
Patellapis kabetensis 
Patellapis kahuziensis 
Patellapis kalutarae 
Patellapis kamerunensis 
Patellapis karooensis 
Patellapis katangensis 
Patellapis kavirondica 
Patellapis keiseri 
Patellapis kinabaluensis 
Patellapis kivuensis 
Patellapis kivuicola 
Patellapis knersvlaktei 
Patellapis knysnae 
Patellapis kocki 
Patellapis kristenseni 
Patellapis leonis 
Patellapis lepesmei 
Patellapis limbata 
Patellapis liodoma 
Patellapis lioscutalis 
Patellapis lombokensis 
Patellapis longifacies 
Patellapis lyalli 
Patellapis macrozonia 
Patellapis malachurina 
Patellapis mandela 
Patellapis mandrakae 
Patellapis merescens 
Patellapis micheneri 
Patellapis micropastina 
Patellapis microzonia 
Patellapis minima 
Patellapis minutior 
Patellapis mirandicornis 
Patellapis montagui 
Patellapis moshiensis 
Patellapis mosselina 
Patellapis mpalaensis 
Patellapis murbana 
Patellapis namaquensis 
Patellapis natalensis 
Patellapis neavei 
Patellapis nefasitica 
Patellapis negritica 
Patellapis neli 
Patellapis nilssoni 
Patellapis ninae 
Patellapis nomioides 
Patellapis obscurescens 
Patellapis ochracea 
Patellapis pachyvertex 
Patellapis pallidicincta 
Patellapis pallidicinctula 
Patellapis partita 
Patellapis pastina 
Patellapis pastinella 
Patellapis pastiniformis 
Patellapis pastinops 
Patellapis patriciformis 
Patellapis patricius 
Patellapis paulyi 
Patellapis pearsoni 
Patellapis pearstonensis 
Patellapis penangensis 
Patellapis perineti 
Patellapis perlucens 
Patellapis perpansa 
Patellapis picturata 
Patellapis platti 
Patellapis plicata 
Patellapis pondoensis 
Patellapis probita 
Patellapis problematica 
Patellapis promita 
Patellapis pseudomontagui 
Patellapis pseudonomioides 
Patellapis pseudorubricata 
Patellapis pseudothoracica 
Patellapis puangensis 
Patellapis pubens 
Patellapis pulchricincta 
Patellapis pulchrihirta 
Patellapis pulchrilucens 
Patellapis punctifrons 
Patellapis renosterveldi 
Patellapis reticulata 
Patellapis reticulosa 
Patellapis retigera 
Patellapis richtersveldi 
Patellapis rothschildiana 
Patellapis rozeni 
Patellapis rubricata 
Patellapis rubrotibialis 
Patellapis rufobasalis 
Patellapis rutshuruensis 
Patellapis ruwensorensis 
Patellapis sabinae 
Patellapis sakagamii 
Patellapis sanguinibasis 
Patellapis schultzei 
Patellapis semipastina 
Patellapis serrifera 
Patellapis sidula 
Patellapis sigiriella 
Patellapis spinulosa 
Patellapis stanleyi 
Patellapis stirlingi 
Patellapis stoeberia 
Patellapis striata 
Patellapis suarezensis 
Patellapis sublustrans 
Patellapis subpatricia 
Patellapis subvittata 
Patellapis suprafulva 
Patellapis tecta 
Patellapis tenuicincta 
Patellapis tenuihirta 
Patellapis tenuimarginata 
Patellapis terminalis 
Patellapis territa 
Patellapis timpageleri 
Patellapis tinctula 
Patellapis trachyna 
Patellapis trifilosa 
Patellapis trizonula 
Patellapis tshibindica 
Patellapis turneri 
Patellapis unifasciata 
Patellapis upembae 
Patellapis upembensis 
Patellapis vanaja 
Patellapis villosicauda 
Patellapis vincta 
Patellapis viridifilosa 
Patellapis virungae 
Patellapis vittata 
Patellapis vumbensis 
Patellapis weisi 
Patellapis wenzeli 
Patellapis yunnanica 
Patellapis zacephala 
Patellapis zaleuca

References

Halictidae